Știuca may refer to the following places in Romania:

 Știuca, a commune in Timiș County
 Știuca, a tributary of the Olt in Harghita County
 Știuca (Timiș), a tributary of the Timiș in Timiș County